Zornia is a cosmopolitan genus of herbs from the legume family Fabaceae. It was recently assigned to the informal monophyletic Adesmia clade of the Dalbergieae.

Species
Zornia comprises the following species:

 Zornia acuta S.T. Reynolds & A.E. Holland
 Zornia adenophora (Domin) Mohlenbr.
 Zornia albiflora Mohlenbr.
 Zornia albolutescens Mohlenbr.

 Zornia apiculata Milne-Redh.
 Zornia areolata Mohlenbr.

 Zornia baliensis Mohlenbr.

 Zornia bracteata J.F. Gmel.
 Zornia brasiliensis Vogel
 Zornia brevipes Milne-Redh.
 Zornia burkartii Vanni

 Zornia cantoniensis Mohlenbr.
 Zornia capensis Pers.
 Zornia cearensis Huber
 Zornia chaetophora F. Muell.

 Zornia contorta Mohlenbr.
 Zornia crinita (Mohlenbr.) Vanni
 Zornia cryptantha Arechav.
 Zornia curvata Mohlenbr.
 Zornia decussata Fort.-Perez, G.P. Lewis & A.M.G. Azevedo
 Zornia diphylla (L.) Pers.

 Zornia disticha S.T. Reynolds & A.E. Holland
 Zornia durumuensis De Wild.
 Zornia dyctiocarpa DC.
 var. dyctiocarpa DC.
 var. filifolia (Domin) S. T. Reynolds & A. E. Holland
 Zornia echinata Mohlenbr.
 Zornia echinocarpa (Meissner) Benth.

 Zornia filifoliola Pittier
 Zornia fimbriata Mohlenbr.
 Zornia flemmingioides Moric.
 Zornia floribunda S.T. Reynolds & A.E. Holland
 Zornia gardneriana Moric.
 Zornia gemella (Willd.) Vogel
 Zornia gibbosa Span.
 Zornia glabra Desv.
 Zornia glaziovii Harms
 Zornia glochidiata DC.

 Zornia grandiflora Fort.-Perez & A.M.G.Azevedo
 Zornia guanipensis Pittier
 Zornia harmsiana Standl.

 Zornia hebecarpa Mohlenbr.
 Zornia herbacea Pittier

 Zornia intecta Mohlenbr.
 Zornia laevis Schltdl. & Cham.

 Zornia lasiocarpa A.R. Molina
 Zornia latifolia Sm.

 Zornia leptophylla (Benth.) Pittier
 Zornia linearis E. Mey.

 Zornia maritima S.T. Reynolds & A.E. Holland
 Zornia megistocarpa Mohlenbr.
 Zornia melanocarpa Fort-Perez 
 Zornia microphylla Desv.
 Zornia milneana Mohlenbr.
 Zornia muelleriana Mohlenbr.
 Zornia multinervosa Bacigalupo
 Zornia muriculata Mohlenbr.
 Zornia myriadena Benth.

 Zornia nuda Vogel

 Zornia oligantha S.T. Reynolds & A.E. Holland
 Zornia orbiculata Mohlenbr.
 Zornia ovata Vogel
 Zornia pallida Mohlenbr.
 Zornia papuensis Mohlenbr.
 Zornia pardina Mohlenbr.
 Zornia pedunculata S.T. Reynolds & A.E. Holland

 Zornia piurensis Mohlenbr.
 Zornia pratensis Milne-Redh.
 subsp. barbata J. Léonard & Milne-Redh.
 subsp. pratensis Milne-Redh.
 var. glabrior Milne-Redh.
 var. pratensis Milne-Redh.
 Zornia puberula Mohlenbr.

 Zornia punctatissima Milne-Redh.
 Zornia quilonensis Ravi
 Zornia ramboiana Mohlenbr.
 Zornia ramosa S.T. Reynolds & A.E. Holland
 Zornia reptans Harms
 Zornia reticulata Sm.
 Zornia sericea Moric.

 Zornia setosa Baker f.
 subsp. obovata Baker f.
 subsp. setosa (Baker f.) J. Léonard & Milne-Redh.
 Zornia sinaloensis Mohlenbr.

 Zornia songeensis Milne-Redh.
 Zornia stirlingii Domin

 Zornia subsessilis Fort.-Perez & A.M.G.Azevedo

 Zornia tenuifolia Moric.

 Zornia thymifolia Kunth
 Zornia trachycarpa Vogel

 Zornia ulei Harms
 Zornia vaughaniana Mohlenbr.
 Zornia venosa Mohlenbr.
 Zornia vestita Mohlenbr.

 Zornia virgata Moric.
 Zornia walkeri Arn.

 Zornia zollingeri Mohlenbr.

References

 
Fabaceae genera
Forages
Taxa named by Johann Friedrich Gmelin